Buzz is the third studio album by British pop group Steps, released on 30 October 2000. It reached number four on the UK Albums Chart. The album saw the group starting to move away from the PWL sound to a more mature sound, working with producers from Sweden and songwriters such as Cyndi Lauper. This more mature sound was also echoed in the new material from Gold: Greatest Hits.

Each member of the group co-wrote a track on the album, consequently doing lead vocals on their respective track. The lead single from the album "Stomp", a funky upbeat song with lyrics about partying at the weekend and having a good time, features a sample from Chic's single "Everybody Dance" and topped the UK Singles Chart, becoming the group's second number 1 hit after "Heartbeat"/"Tragedy".

The songs "Better the Devil You Know" and "Summer of Love", were included on the album after they were released earlier that year as part of double A-side singles with "Say You'll Be Mine" and "When I Said Goodbye" respectively. "It's the Way You Make Me Feel" was the second single to be released from the album and reached number 2 in the UK after copies of the single were released a week early in shops, damaging their chance at taking the number 1 spot; however, this led to the band holding a chart record for the highest chart jump when the track went from number 72 to number 2. "Here and Now" and "You'll Be Sorry" were the final songs released from Buzz and were both included on a double A-side CD single which reached number four in UK. The album was certified Platinum in UK and was released in Australia and US in 2001.

Buzz contains two songs that are cover versions: "Better the Devil You Know" and "Here and Now".

Release and reception

Buzz received favourable critical response from different music magazines and websites. Everyone noticed the group's departure from the "ABBA sound" into their own musical style. AllMusic stated "They do in fact have their own sound, and it has revealed itself here, crystal clear".

This album saw the group leaning toward a more mature and original sound influenced by electro and techno but still keeping the sound prominent to Steps' earlier work. This is seen as the album plays out through tracks such as "You'll Be Sorry", "Never Get Over You" "Happy Go Lucky" and "Buzzz". The art work and overall look for the album is prominent to the sound as their earlier albums had more colour and expression to resemble the enlightenment of the sound of their music. As their sound was more mature their appearances were more sophisticated and showed the progression of Steps into a new era that was carried on into the look of their next album, Gold: Greatest Hits.

In an interview with whereitsat.tv when Steps were asked if their Pete Waterman days where behind them, Lee responded with: "We've been under Pete Waterman's wing for a good two or three years and I think with the third album Buzz, we've had an experience and sort of self-expression and things, you know. We've had our chance, we've wrote, we've helped produce and we've got th[ose] songs on the album Buzz. Now that the greatest hits album is coming out, [we're] writing and helping produce for that as well and then there's an album after that. It's almost like leaving an era behind and moving onto something else, so you could see it as a new beginning in a way."

However, the album is said to be less successful than their first releases, only peaking at number four on the UK Albums Chart and achieving double Platinum status from the British Phonographic Industry (BPI)—Step One was certified 8× Platinum and Steptacular was certified 4× Platinum. It is also considered to be their only album to not sell a million copies in the United Kingdom, before the group's Boxing Day split. To date, it has sold more than 680,000 units in UK, becoming their lowest-selling album while they were still together. The album also features solos from each member apart from Lee, though he is featured on the song he co-wrote, "Turn Around".

Track listing

Note
 "Mars & Venus (We Fall in Love Again)" is only available on the US edition of Buzz and has been left unavailable in the UK, although a remixed form appeared on The Last Dance.

Personnel

 Lisa Scott-Lee – vocals, background vocals
 Faye Tozer – vocals, background vocals
 Lee Latchford-Evans – vocals, background vocals
 Ian 'H' Watkins – vocals, background vocals
 Claire Richards – vocals, background vocals
 Patrik Andrén – keyboards
 Greg Bone – guitar
 Jimmy Bralower – arranger, producer, engineer, drum programming
 Nigel Butler – arranger
 Andy Caine – vocals (background)
 Rita Campbell – vocals (background)
 Mary Carewe – vocals (background)
 Andreas Carlsson – vocals (background)
 Chris DeStefano – bass, keyboards, engineer, drum programming
 Dave Deviller – guitar, programming, producer
 Tim Donovan – engineer
 Lance Ellington – vocals (background)
 Cyndi Lauper – vocals (background)
 Jörgen Elofsson – producer
 Mark Emmitt – mixing
 Andrew Frampton – arranger, producer
 Daniel Frampton – engineer, mixing
 Andy Goldmark – bass, arranger, keyboards, producer, drum programming
 Chaz Harper – mastering
 Simon Hill – drum programming
 Sean Hosein – programming, producer
 Nick Ingman – string arrangements, string conductor
 Henrik Janson – string conductor
 Ulf Jansson – string conductor
 David Krueger – producer
 Josef Larossi – arranger, producer, mixing, instrumentation
 Bernard Loor – mixing
 Gustave Lund – percussion
 Ernie McCone – bass
 Esbjörn Öhrwall – guitar
 Paula Oliveira – assistant engineer, mixing assistant
 Jeanette Olsson – vocals (background)
 Steve Price – engineer, mixing
 Mark "Ridders" Risdale – engineer
 Andreas "Quiz" Romdhane – arranger, producer, mixing, instrumentation
 Shane Stoneback – mixing assistant
 Mark Topham – bass, producer
 Karl Twigg – keyboards, producer
 T-Bone Wolk – guitar
 Hakan Wollgard – string engineer
 Richard Woodcraft – assistant engineer
 Gavyn Wright – violin

Charts and certifications

Release history

References

Steps (group) albums
Jive Records albums
2000 albums